Arun Sundararajan (Tamil: அருண் சுந்தர்ராஜன்) (born in the United Kingdom) is the NEC Faculty Fellow, Professor of Technology, Operations, and Statistics and a Doctoral Coordinator at the Stern School of Business, New York University. For 2010–12, he is the Distinguished Academic Fellow at the Center for IT and the Networked Economy, Indian School of Business. Sundararajan is an expert on the economics of digital goods and network effects. He also conducts research about network science and the socioeconomic transformation of India.

Life and work
Arun Sundararajan graduated from the Indian Institute of Technology Madras in 1993 with a BTech in electrical engineering. He subsequently attended the University of Rochester where he received an M. Phil in operations research and a PhD in business administration. After he earned his doctorate, he joined the faculty at New York University, where his work focuses on the transformation of business and society by information technologies, and the Indian economy.

Sundararajan's scholarly research analyzes what makes the economics of IT products and industries unique. He asserts that there are three technological invariants—digitization, exponential growth, and modularity—that have characterized and distinguished information technologies since the 1960s, and that these invariants lead to the ubiquity of information goods, digital piracy and network effects in IT industries. His research papers illustrate how these distinctive economics of information technologies warrant new pricing strategies, careful digital rights management, and a deeper understanding of network structure and dynamics.

Sundararajan periodically writes and speaks about transformation through information technologies and business with a frequent focus on privacy and on India.
He has been elected to the editorial boards of the prestigious journals Management Science and Information Systems Research (where he is currently a Senior Editor).  He co-founded the NYU Summer Workshop on the Economics of Information Technology and the Workshop on Information in Networks. He received a 2010 Google-WPP Marketing Research Award, the Best Paper award at the 2008 INFORMS Conference on Information Systems and Technology, and the Best Overall Paper award at the 2004 International Conference on Information Systems.

See also
 Digital rights management
 Network effects
 Price discrimination
 Sharing economy

Bibliography
Patent:

Book:

References

External links
 Arun Sundararajan's personal web page
 NYU Stern Faculty Page
 Center for IT and the Networked Economy, Indian School of Business

Living people
New York University Stern School of Business faculty
University of Rochester alumni
21st-century American economists
Information systems researchers
Indian emigrants to the United States
Scientists from Chennai
Year of birth missing (living people)
IIT Madras alumni